Jerzy Janowicz was the defending champion but decided not to participate.
Jesse Huta Galung beat top seeded Robin Haase 6–3, 6–7(2–7), 6–4, to claim the title.

Seeds

Draw

Finals

Top half

Bottom half

References
 Main Draw
 Qualifying Draw

Sport 1 Open - Singles
2013 Singles